Checkley Hall is a small country house in the parish of Checkley cum Wrinehill, Cheshire, England.  The house was built in 1694 by the Delves family of Doddington, replacing an earlier timber-framed house.  It was altered in the late 18th or early 19th century, replacing a hipped roof with an attic.  The house is constructed in brick with a tiled roof.  It has 2½ storeys, and an entrance front with five bays.  The house is recorded in the National Heritage List for England as a designated Grade II* listed building.  Its gate piers are listed at Grade II.

See also

Grade II* listed buildings in Cheshire East
Listed buildings in Checkley cum Wrinehill

References

Country houses in Cheshire
Houses completed in 1694
Grade II* listed buildings in Cheshire
Grade II* listed houses
1694 establishments in England